The Cox–Williams House is a historic house, located in St. Helens, Oregon, United States. It was listed on the National Register of Historic Places on November 1, 1982.  It is also listed as a contributing resource in the National Register-listed St. Helens Downtown Historic District.

See also
National Register of Historic Places listings in Columbia County, Oregon

References

Houses on the National Register of Historic Places in Oregon
Italianate architecture in Oregon
National Register of Historic Places in Columbia County, Oregon
1890s architecture in the United States
Houses in Columbia County, Oregon
St. Helens, Oregon
1890 establishments in Oregon
Historic district contributing properties in Oregon